Sundsvall Dragons was a professional Swedish basketball club from Sundsvall. The Dragons made it to the Basketligan Finals four times: in 2005, 2008 and in 2009 and 2011 as winners.

History
The team was one of the oldest in Sweden, as it was founded on May 9, 1939. In 1993 the team promoted to the Basketligan and was named the Sundsvall Dragons.

In 2008, 6-time NBA champion and 7-time All-Star Scottie Pippen played for the team. Pippen, at age 42, played one game for Sundsvall in which he recorded 21 points, 12 rebounds and 6 assists. Pippen was paid $66,000 to play in the game against Akropal.

On 6 May 2016 the club was declared bankrupt.

Championships
Swedish Championships: 2
2008–09, 2010–11

Season by season

Notable players

References

External links
Team profile at eurobasket.com

Basketball teams in Sweden
Sport in Sundsvall
1939 establishments in Sweden
Basketball teams established in 1939